Al Wiggins may refer to:
Alan Wiggins (1958–1991), American baseball player
Albert Wiggins (1935–2011), American swimmer